Frenchville is an unincorporated community in Clearfield County, Pennsylvania, United States. Frenchville has a post office with ZIP code 16836, which opened on February 18, 1839. Frenchville was named for the French ancestry of its first settlers. In this community developed Frenchville French, a unique dialect of the French language that was spoken in the area until the 1960s. The first white burial in the county (1771) was a French seaman, Tohas Auxe, who died en route from Canada to New Orleans. The stone was discovered on a local farm in 1896. The annual Frenchville Picnic is held at the St. Mary's Catholic Church since the 1870s.

References

Unincorporated communities in Clearfield County, Pennsylvania
Unincorporated communities in Pennsylvania
French-American culture in Pennsylvania